The Yongsan Line is a branch railroad of the Gyeongui Line, currently in service on the Gyeongui-Jungang Line. It connects Yongsan Station to Gajwa Station on the Gyeongui Line. The line was abandoned in 2005, but was reopened as an underground subway line in 2012 from Gajwa Station to Gongdeok Station and in 2014 from Gongdeok Station to Yongsan Station.

Stations

 
Korail lines
Railway lines in South Korea
Railway lines opened in 1905
1905 establishments in Korea